Berrocal  is a city in the province of Huelva, Spain.

Berrocal may also refer to:

Places
 Berrocal de Huebra, Salamanca, Spain
 Berrocal de Salvatierra, Salamanca, Spain

People
Carla Berrocal (born 1983), Spanish comics illustrator
Carlos Berrocal (born 1957), Puerto Rican Olympic swimmer
Jac Berrocal (born 1946), French musician
Jesús Berrocal (born 1988), Spanish footballer
José Berrocal (1957–2000), president of Puerto Rico Government Development Bank
Juan Berrocal González (born 1999), Spanish footballer
Miguel Ortiz Berrocal (1933–2006), Spanish artist known for his puzzle sculptures
Yola Berrocal (born 1970), Spanish dancer, singer, and actress